was a town located in Sashima District, Ibaraki Prefecture, Japan.

As of 2003, the town had an estimated population of 15,145 and a density of 466.57 persons per km2. The total area was 32.46 km2.

On March 22, 2005, Sashima, along with the city of Iwai, was merged to create the city of Bandō and no longer exists as an independent municipality.

External links
 Official website of Bandō 

Dissolved municipalities of Ibaraki Prefecture
Bandō, Ibaraki